Kiwa NV is a European institution for testing, inspection and certification (TIC), headquartered in Rijswijk, the Netherlands. The institution is highly active in over fifty countries worldwide. Kiwa participates in the safety analysis of many new European and international technologies, as well as the drafting of safety standards for numerous devices and components. Kiwa provides safety-related certification, testing, inspection, auditing, advising and training services to a wide range of clients, including manufacturers, policymakers, regulators, service companies and consumers.

History
Established in 1948 as the Judging Institute for Water Supply Articles, it has remained known throughout the 20th century simply as Kiwa. Kiwa's initial aim was monitoring the quality of drinking water across the Netherlands. Demands were made that articles used in drinking water processing and management (such as water pipes, fittings and valves) had to meet certain standards, and Kiwa was responsible for testing their compliance to said standards. Products that meet the requirements are still marked with the Kiwa label. Kiwa's stringent testing methodologies allowed the organization to expand. The company became active in various European and international markets, providing services relating to independent quality assessment and quality certificates for products and services in various industries and sectors.

Certification
The issuing of quality declarations in the form of certificates forms the basis of the organization's activities. Kiwa is defined as an independent party or a company/institution that meets the requirements of a product, service, system or person. The requirements are established in consultation with all stakeholders including producers, consumers, certification bodies and a so-called Committee of Experts in a particular field. Once certified, the products and services are provided with a trademarked label for the purposes of visual identification. Kiwa provides both in-house and licensed certification labels. These include transport and logistics, management systems (e.g. ISO 9000 and ISO 14001), agriculture, feed & food (including HACCP), health care, safety and corporate social responsibility.

Testing and Inspection
Kiwa has a network of testing laboratories in Europe and the Far East for testing various kinds of products. Through them, the organization offers testing and inspection services in the areas of roofing and outer walls, gas and gas installations, infrastructure, calibration, polymers, drinking water installations, sports floors, and solar panels. Most of its clients are from the manufacturing and process industries, public and private utilities, government agencies and international institutions. Kiwa is active in over fifty countries with offices in many European states as well as in Taiwan, Peru and China.

Business structure and development
Kiwa is organized into the so-called Service Lines, which include "Compliance", "Assurance" and "Information". One line is for certification and related activities, and the other for 'Information' and other activities. A service line is made up of a number of units, each with its own focus. The business units are in themselves an independent unit. Kiwa grew both organically as well as through strategic acquisitions. The first large acquisition took place in 2005 with Gastec Apeldoorn, the former GIVEG. Subsequently, it carried out several other acquisitions in the Netherlands and elsewhere in the world in various market segments. As of 2020, the company employs over 5,300 people and has offices in over 35 countries

External links
 Kiwa NV official website
 Kiwa Nederlands website

References

Commercial laboratories
Organizations established in 1848
Standards organisations in the Netherlands
Product-testing organizations
Laboratories in Australia
Laboratories in Germany
Laboratories in the United Kingdom
Laboratories in Spain
Laboratories in China
Laboratories in the Netherlands